Emir Lotinac (Serbian Cyrillic: Емир Лотинац; born September 25, 1987) is a Serbian footballer who last played for the Vojvodina.

Career
Lotinac was born in Novi Pazar. He began his career in his native country, Serbia, with his hometown club Novi Pazar.

He played four seasons with Novi Pazar. In 2007, he made his debut in Serbian SuperLiga. During the 2007–08 season, he joined OFK Beograd in the Serbian SuperLiga. 2008–09 he was loaned back to Novi Pazar. Later he moved on to Metalac Kraljevo.

In 2014, Lotinac signed for Singapore's S.League side Balestier Khalsa, occupying 1 of the team's 5 foreign signing slots. He was also a roommate with teammate Tarik Čmajčanin who both scored their first 2015 S.League goal for the Tigers in a 5-1 demolition of Courts Young Lions on 4 April 2015.

In February 2017 Lotinac signed a one-year-deal with Vojvodina.

Honours
Balestier Khalsa
 Singapore Cup: 2014

References

External links
 Profile at Srbijafudbal
 Emir Lotinac Stats at Utakmica.rs
 

Living people
1987 births
Sportspeople from Novi Pazar
Bosniaks of Serbia
Serbian footballers
FK Novi Pazar players
OFK Beograd players
Serbian SuperLiga players
Association football defenders
Balestier Khalsa FC players
Singapore Premier League players
Expatriate footballers in Singapore